Abdul Ganiyu Ambali (born 29 November 1957) is a Nigerian academic, administrator and former vice chancellor of the University of Ilorin. Ambali was also former chairman of the Association of West African Universities (AWAU), and a recipient of one of Nigeria's highest honours, CON.

Early life and education
Abdul Ganiyu Ambali was born in Ilorin, Kwara State to the family of Mall. Ambali Gidado and Mrs. Husseina Angulu. Ambali had his primary education at Pakata Primary School, Ilorin, he proceeded to McBride Secondary School Jalingo, (now Government Secondary School, Jalingo) in Taraba State, Nigeria.
Abdul was awarded a scholarship from the Borno State government to pursue an undergraduate degree in veterinary medicine at the Ahmadu Bello University which he completed in 1981. He had his masters and Doctorate degree from the University of Liverpool, United Kingdom.
Ambali became a Member of College of Veterinary Surgeons of Nigeria, (MCVSN) in 2004 and Fellow of College of Veterinary Surgeons of Nigeria (FCVSN) in 2009.

Career
Abdul Ganiyu started his career as an Assistant at the University of Maiduguri immediately after his National service where he served with the Ministry of Rural & Community Development, Kano in 1982. Ambali became a Professor in 1995. He has served as a member of the National Universities Commission (NUC), Veterinary Council of Nigeria (VCN), Department of Livestock Services of the Federal Livestock Department, Federal Ministry of Agriculture, monitoring the accreditation of several institutions, industries and agencies.
As the vice chancellor of the University of Ilorin, he stated that "his target for the university is for it to be the number one varsity in Africa".

National service
Ambali served as the Collation Officer for 2015 Presidential election in Nigeria and Returning Officer for Governorship election for Niger State.

Honours and awards
Ambali was a recipient of several awards some of which includes
Distinguished Veterinarian Award, 2013, by the Nigerian Veterinary Medical Association (NVMA)
Fellow of Science Association of Nigeria (SAN)
Fellow of the Institute of Corporate Administration of Nigeria
Fellow of the Solar Energy Society of Nigeria
National Merit Award of Officer of the Order of the Niger (OON)  by the Federal Government of Nigeria.

Controversy
Legit reported that he was walked out by House of Representatives Standing Committee on Tertiary Education and Services after failing to explain the amount allocated for several projects in 2015. The committee declined to take a look at the university's 2016 budget saying that of 2015 was shrouded in controversy. 
A member of the committee Hon. Kehinde Odeneye was quoted as saying "How many days were spent at the hotels and who were the guests you hosted? Then another N100 million for takeoff grant for new departments without actually telling us how many they are and the things needed for the takeoff. Also N50 million on workshops and seminars. This is apart from the training grants obtained. Then, there is maintenance of buildings which also is without details".

Personal life
Ambali is married with children, and his hobbies are playing football, watching wildlife films and listening to music.

References

Living people
1957 births
Vice-Chancellors of Nigerian universities
Academic staff of the University of Ilorin
Ahmadu Bello University alumni
Alumni of the University of Liverpool
People from Kwara State